Davidite is a rare earth oxide mineral with chemical end members La and Ce. It exists in two forms:
Davidite-(La)  discovered at Radium Hill mine, South Australia in 1906 and named by Douglas Mawson for Australian geologist Tannatt William Edgeworth David (1858-1934).
Davidite-(Ce)  first described in 1960 from Vemork, Iveland, Norway.

References

Uranium minerals
Trigonal minerals
Minerals in space group 148